Twin city or twin town may refer to:

Definitions
Twin cities, two towns or cities that are geographically close to each other, and often referred to collectively
Sister cities, distant cities or towns that agree to partner each other, for various reasons

Geography
Ballybofey and Stranorlar, in the Irish county of Donegal, often called the Twin Towns
Champaign–Urbana, in the U.S. state of Illinois, often called the Twin Cities
Dallas-Fort Worth, in the U.S. state of Texas
Lewiston–Auburn, in the U.S. state of Maine, often called the Twin Cities
Minneapolis–Saint Paul in the U.S. state of Minnesota, most commonly referred to as the Twin Cities
Trinidad and Tobago, in the Caribbean
Twin City, Georgia, a city
Twin Town, Wisconsin, an unincorporated community
Winston-Salem, North Carolina, nicknamed The Twin City

Other uses
Twin City (Bratislava), name of the biggest multifunction building complex in Central Europe, under construction
Twin Town, a 1997 comedy film

See also
Cândido Godói, a town in Brazil known for its unusually high twin population
Towns of twins, a list of cities with exceptionally high twins birth rates
Twin Cities (disambiguation)
Twin Township (disambiguation)
Twinsburg, Ohio, location of an annual twin convention